Phalaenopsis fasciata is an endemic species of orchid from the Philippines. The flower is small, dark yellow in color and contains thin brown stripes to petals and sepals. The color of this species is nearly identical to Phalaenopsis reichenbachiana but only differs in the lip detail which is not triangular.

External links
 
 

fasciata
Orchids of the Philippines